Gismondo, rè di Polonia ossia il vincitor generoso ("Sigismund, King of Poland or the Generous Victor") is an opera (dramma per musica) whose libretto was written by Francesco Briani and with music composed by Leonardo Vinci.

It was first performed in Rome, at the Teatro delle Dame on 11 January 1727 as part of the festivities of the Carnival.

The original libretto, written for Lotti's opera of the same name, is an homage to Frederick IV of Denmark lauding monarchic values and diplomatic virtues. In the same spirit, Vinci's opera is dedicated to "Giacomo III, Rè della Gran Brettagna &c.", i.e. James Francis Edward Stuart.

Synopsis 
In order to put an end to their war, the king of Poland (Gismondo) and the duke of Lithuania (Primislao)  are trying to negotiate a peace alliance in the form of a marriage between Otone (son of Gismondo) and Cunegonda  (Primislao’s daughter) who happen to be in love. But when the peace process is sabotaged Primislao believes Gismondo responsible for his public humiliation and the war starts again. After a particularly violent battle Primislao is believed dead, leading Cunegonda to seek revenge on Otone. However it is revealed that Giuditta, Otone's sister, who, from the start, was secretly in love with Primislao, has rescued the latter and peace can now be made.

Roles 
The original cast were all castrati, as the opera was produced in Rome, where women were forbidden to appear on stage.

Recordings 

 Vinci, Leonardo: Gismondo, re di Polonia. Max Emanuel Cenčić (Gismondo), Yuriy Mynenko (Otone), Sophie Junker (Cunegonda), Aleksandra Kubas-Kruk (Primislao), Jake Arditti (Ernesto), Dilyara Idrisova (Giuditta), Nicholas Tamagna (Ermano), {oh!} Orkestra Historyczna, Martyna Pastuszka. Parnassus Arts, 2020.

References

External links 

Operas
Opera seria
Italian-language operas
Music dedicated to nobility or royalty
1727 operas
Operas by Leonardo Vinci